Japan competed at the 2013 World Games held in Cali, Colombia.

Medalists

Karate 

In total three gold medals and one bronze medal were won by Japanese karateka.

Ryutaro Araga won the gold medal in the men's kumite 84 kg event, Kayo Someya won the gold medal in the women's kumite 68 kg event and Ayumi Uekusa won the gold medal in the women's kumite +68 kg event. Ryo Kiyuna won the bronze medal in the men's kata event.

Powerlifting 

Yukako Fukushima won the bronze medal in the women's lightweight event.

References 

Nations at the 2013 World Games
2013 in Japanese sport
2013